De Luxe Annie is a 1918 American silent drama film directed by Roland West and starring Norma Talmadge, Eugene O'Brien, and Frank Mills.

Plot
As described in a film magazine review, Julie Kendal, loving wife of a devoted husband, is struck on the head and becomes an aphasia victim. While in this condition she becomes she becomes the confederate of a crook who practices the old badger game. She one day strays into the town in which she lives, and all unwittingly led by a chain of events to her own home. There her husband and a doctor friend find her. By means of an operation she is restored to health and is happily reunited with her husband.

Cast

Preservation
A copy of De Luxe Annie is in the Library of Congress and the holdings of Cohen Media.

References

External links

1918 films
American silent feature films
American black-and-white films
Films directed by Roland West
Silent American drama films
1918 drama films
Selznick Pictures films
1910s American films
Silent adventure films